Saint Petersburg University of Economics, Culture and Business Administration (Санкт-Петербургский Институт Экономики, Культуры и Делового Администрирования Sankt Peterburgskiy institut ekonomiki kultury i delovogo administrirovaniya), is a private institution of higher education in Saint Petersburg, Russia.  The university was established in 1999.  It has two faculties - the Faculty of Arts and the Faculty of Management.

Universities in Saint Petersburg
Educational institutions established in 1999
1999 establishments in Russia